Everything Will Be Fine! is a 1995 comedy film directed by Dmitry Astrakhan.

Plot 
Quiet and measured life in an old residence of a provincial town are waiting for fun change in the lives of the main characters of the film Kolya, Olya and Petya and other hostel residents. It all starts with the return of Nikolay (Kolya) from the Army; he prepares for his wedding with Olga. At the same time, the city comes to businessman Konstantin Smirnov, who once lived in this hostel. Naturally, he visit his first love (Kolya's mother). Konstantin's son, Pyotr (Petya), a young genius, winner of the Nobel Prize, falls in love with Olya and meets reciprocal feelings. Olya makes a painfully difficult choice in favor of the groom. Peter comes to the wedding to wish happiness to the young couple, but runs away with the bride. Olga and Pyotr live happily abroad, and Kolya finds a job at the plant.

Cast
 Anatoly Zhuravlyov as Kolya Orlov
 Olga Ponizova as Olga 
 Mark Goronok as Pyotr Smirnov
 Aleksandr Zbruyev as Konstantin Petrovich Smirnov
 Valentin Bukin asSemyon Petrovich, Olya's father
 Mikhail Ulyanov as Grandpa
 Valentina Panina as Natasha
 Irina Mazurkevich as Aunt Katya, Kolya's  mother 
 Vladimir Kabalin as Uncle Vova 
 Andrey Fedortsov as Kolya's friend
 Arthur Vakha as administrator
 Valery Kravchenko as Andrey Samsonov
 Dmitry Astrakhan as mathematician

Awards 
 1995 — Grand Prix Love is Folly (Varna)
 1995 — Kinotavr — Nomination: Greater Grand Prix competition

References

External links

1995 films
Lenfilm films
Russian comedy films
1995 comedy films
Films directed by Dmitry Astrakhan